James Blackburn Adams (December 21, 1926 – April 25, 2020) was an American attorney, politician, and two-time associate director of the Federal Bureau of Investigation.

Early life and education
James B. Adams was born in Corsicana, Texas in 1926. He served in the U.S. Army during World War II as a Japanese translator, before returning to Texas to obtain a Bachelor of Arts degree from Baylor University and a law degree from Baylor Law School.

In January 2007, Adams received the Baylor Distinguished Alumni Award.

Career 
After graduating from law school, Adams became a prosecuting attorney. He was elected to the Texas House of Representatives in 1950. Adams took office in 1951 as a Democrat, and resigned his seat later that year to join the Federal Bureau of Investigation. Adams was succeeded in the Texas House by W. H. Gant.

As an FBI special agent, Adams served in Seattle, San Francisco, and the Administrative Services Division. In 1959, he was appointed assistant special agent in charge of Minneapolis and in 1972 he was promoted to special agent in charge of San Antonio, Texas. In 1973, he was appointed assistant director of the Office of Planning and Evaluation and became assistant to the director/deputy associate director for investigations the following year.

In early 1977, Director of the Federal Bureau of Investigation Clarence M. Kelley announced his intention to retire. On September 30, 1977, President Jimmy Carter nominated Judge Frank Minis Johnson of the United States District Court for the Middle District of Alabama to the post. However Johnson developed severe health problems and Carter withdrew the nomination in December. Carter nominated then-judge on the United States Court of Appeals for the Eighth Circuit, William H. Webster, in January 1978. Adams served as Acting Director of the FBI from Kelley's retirement on February 15 to 23, 1978, when Webster was sworn in. Adams retired from the FBI on May 11, 1979. He then returned to Texas, where he served as Director of the Texas Department of Public Safety from 1980 to 1987.

Controversies

While Director of the Texas Department of Public Safety, Adams authorized an investigation into the District Attorney of McLennan County, Vic Feazell. Feazell had initiated an investigation into the Texas Rangers who had relied on the unreliable confessions of Henry Lee Lucas to close over 300 homicide investigations across the United States despite some confessions being clearly false. Adams authorized the investigation into Feazell as retribution for questioning the Texas Rangers, who were under Adams' authority. Following a raid of Feazell's home and office, he was charged with bribery, but eventually acquitted at trial.

Personal life 
Adams was married to Ione LaRae Winistorfer from September 1955 to his death on April 25, 2020, aged 93. Flags on Texas state and federal government buildings were lowered to half-staff to commemorate Adams.

References

1926 births
Baylor Law School alumni
Deputy Directors of the Federal Bureau of Investigation
Directors of the Federal Bureau of Investigation
2020 deaths
Democratic Party members of the Texas House of Representatives
Military personnel from Texas
People from Corsicana, Texas
Politicians from San Antonio
Texas lawyers
Recipients of the National Intelligence Distinguished Service Medal
20th-century American politicians
20th-century American lawyers
Japanese–English translators
American translators
United States Army personnel of World War II